Helvig of Schauenburg (1398–1436) was a duchess of Schleswig and a countess of Holstein from the family of Schauenburg.
She was the mother of  King Christian I of Denmark and ancestor of the Danish Royal houses of Oldenburg and Schleswig-Holstein-Sonderburg-Glücksburg.

Biography
She was a daughter of Gerhard VI of Holstein-Rendsburg and his wife, Catherine Elisabeth of Brunswick-Lüneburg. Her brother was Adolf VIII/I, Count of Holstein/Duke of Schleswig. Through their father, they were cognatic descendants of King Eric V of Denmark (1249–1286) while through their mother, they were cognatic descendants of King Abel of Denmark (1218–1252).

On 18 April 1417 Helvig was married to Prince Balthasar of Mecklenburg, who died of the plague in 1421. In 1423 she was married to Dietrich, Count of Oldenburg. From her second marriage she had the following children:
 Christian I of Denmark (1426–1481), who succeeded his father as Count of Oldenburg and Delmenhorst. In 1448, he was elected King of Denmark. He also inherited the counties of Schleswig and Holstein upon the death of his childless uncle, Adolf VIII.
 Maurice V of Delmenhorst (1428–1464); when his elder brother became king, he was given the County of Delmenhorst.
 Gerhard VI of Oldenburg (1430–1500); when his eldest brother had become king, he was given the county of Oldenburg, and from his other brother's heirs he also inherited Delmenhorst in about 1483. 
 Adelheid of Oldenburg (1425–1475); first married Ernest III, Count of Hohenstein (died 1454) and then in 1474 Gerhard VI, Count of Mansfeld (died 1492).

References

Other Sources

Hartmut Platte  (2006)  Das Haus Oldenburg (Börde-Verlag, Werl)

Ancestry

Danish royal descent

See also 
 Counts of Schauenburg and Holstein

1398 births
1436 deaths
15th-century German people
15th-century German women
Countesses of Oldenburg
House of Mecklenburg
House of Oldenburg in Oldenburg
House of Schauenburg
Daughters of monarchs